was a  Japanese photographer.

Selected photos

References

Japanese photographers
Hibakusha
1916 births
1988 deaths